Florasongs (stylized in lowercase caps) is an EP by the American indie rock band The Decemberists, released on October 9, 2015, on Capitol Records. The release is composed of five out-takes from their seventh studio album, What a Terrible World, What a Beautiful World.

Reception

Critical reception to florasongs was mixed, but mostly positive. The EP did not receive a rating from an aggregate score website, but it did garner reviews from primarily independent music criticism websites. Pitchfork's Evan Rytlewski wrote in his review, "Unlike its full-length counterpart, though, Florasongs has brevity working in its favor." Rytlewski later penned, "Florasongs never overcomes the sense that they’re selling themselves short, penning good-enough songs when they used to shoot for grand, great ones."

Track listing 
All songs are written and composed by Colin Meloy.
"Why Would I Now?" – 3:42
"Riverswim" – 4:53
"Fits & Starts" – 2:41
"The Harrowed and the Haunted" – 4:07
"Stateside" – 3:25

Personnel
The Decemberists
Jenny Conlee – piano, organ, backing vocals, Vibraphone, Accordion, production
Chris Funk – acoustic guitar, electric guitar, banjo, bouzouki, mandolin, production
Colin Meloy – vocals, drum programming, acoustic guitar, electric guitar, harmonica, bouzouki, tambourine, production
John Moen – drums, backing, production
Nate Query – bass guitar, upright bass, production

Additional musicians
Anna Fritz – cello
Kyleen King – viola 
Patti King – violin
Rob Moose – violin and string arrangements
Rachel Flotard – backing
Kelly Hogan – backing
Laura Veirs – backing

Production
Carson Ellis – illustrations, lettering
Stephen Marcussen – mastering
Tucker Martine – engineering, mixing, production
Greg Ornella – engineering
Nick Steinhardt – design

References

2015 EPs
Albums produced by Tucker Martine
Capitol Records EPs
Folk rock EPs
The Decemberists albums